Delphine Blanc (born 7 June 1983 in La Tronche) is a French football player who last played for Paris Saint-Germain of the Division 1 Féminine. She plays as a right back, but is also capable of playing in the midfield. Blanc is currently a member of the senior team making her debut in 2006. She played with the team at UEFA Women's Euro 2009.

International goals

References

External links
 
 
  
 Player French football stats at footofeminin.fr 

1983 births
Living people
Sportspeople from La Tronche
French women's footballers
France women's international footballers
Montpellier HSC (women) players
Olympique Lyonnais Féminin players
AS Saint-Étienne (women) players
Paris Saint-Germain Féminine players
Rodez AF (women) players
Division 1 Féminine players
Women's association football fullbacks
Footballers from Auvergne-Rhône-Alpes